The Immaculate Conception Cathedral Also Texcoco Cathedral is a Catholic cathedral that is located in the former convent that the Franciscans built in the 16th century in the town of Texcoco in Mexico. This is one of the first complex conventions that the Franciscan order built on lands of the new world, to carry out the process of evangelization.

The Franciscan friars, with Pedro de Gante, erected the first monastery in the area, for the year 1526, with the help of the native labor of the area. The major church was not built until 40 years later, around 1576.

Like all the conventual assemblages that were built in the sixteenth century, it had a fortified aspect, which are still preserves the high walls of the cathedral. This was changed during the works carried out towards the 17th century, when it was given its present appearance (1690-1700).

It was made a cathedral in 1961, and Francisco Ferreira y Arreola was the first bishop.

See also
Roman Catholicism in Mexico
Immaculate Conception Cathedral

References

Roman Catholic cathedrals in Mexico
Roman Catholic churches completed in 1664
Texcoco, State of Mexico
17th-century Roman Catholic church buildings in Mexico